The 2018 Malawi census was the sixth national census in Malawi, which took place on 3-23 September 2018. The population of Malawi was counted as 17,563,749 – an increase of 4,534,251 (34.8%) over the 2008 census.

Preliminary results from the 2018 census were released to the public in December 2018 and final results in May 2019, from the National Statistical Office of Malawi website. The next Malawian census is set to be held in September 2028.

Projections
The 2018 projected population of Malawi was 17,931,637 based on the medium variant of projections based on the 2008 census.
The actual enumerated population was 17,563,749 which was about 98% the size of the 2018 projection.

Results

Population and dwellings
Population counts for regions of Malawi. All figures are for the census de jure population count.

 Resident population count was 17,563,749, up 4,534,251 from the 2008 Census.
 There are 8,521,460 males in New Zealand (48.52% of the population) and 9,042,289 females (51.48% of the population).
 On average, the population grew by around 2.9% per year since the 2008 Census – slightly higher than the annual average growth between 1998 and 2008, which was 2.8%.

Birthplace
In 2018, 17,506,538 people (99.67%) were born in Malawi, with 57,211 (0.33%) born abroad.

Ethnicity 

The 2018 Census asked a question on ethnicity for the first time and the five largest ethnic groups were Chewa (34.4%), Lomwe (18.9%), Yao (13.3%), Ngoni (10.4%), and Tumbuka (9.2%).

Data is for the population that stated their ethnicity.

Religion 
According to the 2018 Census, 77.3% of the population identified as being Christian, 13.8% as Muslim, 2.1% identified as having no religion, 1.1% as having traditional religions, and 5.6% had other religions.

References

Malawi